The Diocese of Emmaus is an ancient and titular diocese of the Roman Catholic Church, located in Emmaus/Nicopolis, Israel, (modern Imwas). The current bishop is Giacinto-Boulos Marcuzzo who resides in Nazareth.

History

Being a small town only  from Jerusalem, the village of Emmaus was not initially a bishopric, but rather part of the bishopric of Jerusalem.

In 131 CE,  Christian scholar and writer Julius Africanus of Jerusalem, headed an embassy to Rome and had an interview with the Roman emperor Elagabalus on behalf of Emmaus. Soon after it was refounded to become a  "city" (πόλις), which quickly became famous, and was given the qualification of "Nicopolis".
Eusebius a century latter writes Emmaus, whence was Cleopas who is mentioned by the Evangelist Luke. Today it is Nicopolis, a famous city of Palestine.
Jerome described how the towns congregation "consecrated the house of Cleopas as a church."

The bishopric of Emmaus was mentioned by St. Jerome, Hesychius of Jerusalem, Theophanes the Confessor, Sozomen, and Theodosius.

In 222 CE, a basilica was erected there, which was rebuilt first by the Byzantines and later modified by the Crusaders.
This Diocese, however, must not have been of significance, being represented at only one of the first four councils nor mentioned by Michel Le Quien  but was in the Notitiae Ecclesiastica.

The ancient bishopric ended when the Islamic armies entered the city. At the time of the Muslim conquest of Palestine, the main encampment of the Arab army was established in Emmaus, when a plague struck, killing as many as 25,000 of the army.

In the 7th century both Willibald of Eichstätt and Hugeburc von Heidenheim, in her The Life of St. Willibald both describe the town church and "holy well".

The church was one of 30,000 Christian buildings destroyed in 1009AD by al-Hakim bi-Amr Allah, the Fatimid caliph of Egypt.

In the 12th century William of Tyre, described the abundance of water and fodder in the area around the town, and Daniel Kievsky wrote of the site, "but now all is destroyed by the pagans and the village of Emmaus is empty." John Phocas (ca.1185) also described the town.

The Bishopric was re-established in 1099 when the army of the First Crusade, arrived in the town. But came under the rule of the Ottoman Empire in the early 16th century and, the church built by the Crusaders converted into a mosque.

In 1930, the Carmelite Order built a monastery, the House of Peace, on a  tract of land purchased in the town in 1878. and three years latter it was established as a titular see in the Roman Catholic Church.

Known bishops

Ancient diocese
Petros Longius, bishop of Nikopolis attendee at the Council of Nicaea.

Titular Catholic see

Giacinto-Boulos Marcuzzo
Franco Costa (1963.12.18 – 1977.01.22) 
 Carlo Maccari (1961.06.10 – 1963.10.31)
 Jolando Nuzzi (1959.08.08 – 1961.05.20)
 Joseph Patrick Donahue (1945.01.27 – 1959.04.26) 
Giuseppe Signore (1928.12.01 – 1944.08.11)
 Algernon Charles Stanley (1903.02.12 – 1928.04.23)
 James Laird Patterson (1880.04.20 – 1902.12.03)
Henricus den Dubbelden (1842.01.14 – 1851.10.13)
 Jean-Denis Gauthier (1839.12.10 – 1877.12.08) 
Johann Maximilian von Haunold (1792.06.18 – 1807.01.20) 
 Adam Stanisław Naruszewicz (1775.03.13 – 1788.11.28)
 Franciszek Kobielski (1760.01.28 – 1766.05.01)
 Kajetan Ignacy Sołtyk (1749.09.22 – 1756.04.19) 
 Lothar Friedrich von Nalbach (1730.10.02 – 1748.05.11)
 Bartolomeo Fargna (1729.02.07 – 1730)

Church buildings
Emmaus Nicoplis, Latrun, Betharram/Beatitudes
Emmaus Qubeibeh, Qubeibeh, Franciscans

See also
 Catholic Church in Israel
 Custody of the Holy Land.

External links
Emmaus-Nicopolis, official site

References

Titular sees in Asia
Roman Catholic dioceses in the Crusader states
Former Roman Catholic dioceses in Asia